Henrik Malde Breimyr (born 20 July 1993) is a Norwegian footballer, playing for Egersund. Breimyr plays as a central defender.

Club career
Henrik played schoolboy football for Fulham and Reading. He was released by Reading in the summer of 2009 and joined Aldershot Town's academy. He has also played for the club's reserves.

After impressive appearances for Aldershot's youth and reserve teams, Henrik was given a trial by Chelsea's academy in February 2011, playing against the academy sides of Portsmouth, Birmingham and Milton Keynes Dons.

Breimyr was runner-up in the 2011 League Two Apprentice of the Year, and signed a professional contract with Aldershot in April 2011 that tied him to the club until 2013.

In February 2012, Breimyr joined the Norwegian side Viking on a one-year-long loan deal. He made his debut in Tippeligaen against Haugesund on 28 April 2012, when he replaced Christian Landu Landu as a substitute in the 55th minute. Breimyr spent most of the first half of the season playing at Viking's reserve team in the Third Division, and the loan-deal was terminated on 3 August 2012 by mutual consent. Instead Breimyr was loaned out to First Division side Bryne on 22 August 2012.

Breimyr left IL Hødd at the end of the 2018 season.

International career

Towards the end of the 2011–12 season, Breimyr was called up to the Norway under-18 squad for the Slovakia Cup. He played in all four of Norway's games, including the loss to Denmark under-18s in the final of the tournament. From there on he has been a regular in the national team squad and currently has a total of seven under-18 caps and four under-19 caps.
He made his debut for the under-21 side on 6 February 2013 against Turkey.

Career statistics

References

External links
 

1993 births
Living people
Sportspeople from Stavanger
Norwegian footballers
Reading F.C. players
Aldershot Town F.C. players
Eastleigh F.C. players
Viking FK players
Bryne FK players
IK Start players
Sandnes Ulf players
National League (English football) players
Eliteserien players
Norwegian First Division players
Norwegian expatriate footballers
Expatriate footballers in England
Norwegian expatriate sportspeople in England
Norway youth international footballers
Association football midfielders
IL Hødd players
Tromsdalen UIL players
Egersunds IK players
Norwegian Second Division players